The Stop Iran Rally took place in Times Square, New York City, on July 22, 2015. The rally was against the just-signed Joint Comprehensive Plan of Action, which was perceived to give Iran the ability to gain a nuclear weapon. Protestors and speakers encouraged the United States Congress to vote against the deal. Since most Republicans in Congress were already against it, the rally focused on persuading Democratic members of Congress, especially Chuck Schumer. Members of both parties, including former New York governor George Pataki and Harvard law professor Alan Dershowitz spoke against the deal.

The rally was organized by Jeffery Wiesenfeld.

References

External links
 

2015 protests
Nuclear program of Iran
Times Square
Demonstrations
2015 politics in New York (state)
2015 in New York City